Cut throat competition is a term that was widely used to describe the reason for consumer protection regulation, labour law, and enforcement of competition law or antitrust, in the late 19th and early 20th century.

In economics, cut throat competition is also referred to as ruinous, excessive or unfettered competition. More generally, cut throat competition is also subsumed under the term "destructive competition".

Many countries have strict legislation against cut throat competition and anti-competitive practices in pricing.

According to the Federal Trade Commission, the alleged necessity of a pricing agreement to avoid cut-throat competition is not considered a valid defense in the case of a proven price fixing agreement.

See also
National Recovery Administration
Race to the bottom

References

Works or authors cited in Wikipedia
Sidney Webb and Beatrice Webb, Industrial Democracy (1st edn 1897; 9th edn 1926) 
Louis Brandeis

Inline references

Consumer protection
Labour law